The 2nd alpine Artillery Regiment ) is an inactive field artillery regiment of the Italian Army, specializing in mountain combat. Since their formation the Mountain Artillery Regiments have served alongside the Alpini, the mountain infantry speciality of the Italian Army, which distinguished itself in combat during World War I and World War II. Besides their close history, the Alpini and Mountain Artillery regiments share the distinctive Cappello Alpino. The regiment was disbanded in 2013 and its FH-70 towed howitzers were transferred to the re-raised 185th Parachute Artillery Regiment Folgore of the Folgore Parachute Brigade in Bracciano.

History 
The unit was raised as 3rd Mountain Artillery Regiment in the city of Bergamo on 15 February 1915. On the same date it received the Mountain Artillery Group Oneglia from the 1st Mountain Artillery Regiment and the Mountain Artillery Group Bergamo from the 2nd Mountain Artillery Regiment. To bring the regiment to full strength on the same date the mountain artillery groups Genova and Como were raised. The regiment was tasked to provide artillery support to the 1st and 5th Alpini regiments and recruited in Liguria and Lombardy.

World War 1

During the war the regiment's depots raised and trained the commands of one mountain artillery grouping (Raggruppamento Artiglieria Montagna), the commands of 17 mountain artillery groups (Gruppo Artiglieria Montagna), and 44 mountain artillery batteries, which were each equipped with four 65/17 mod. 13 cannons. Furthermore, two commands of siege groups (Gruppo d'Assedio), and 19 siege batteries were raised and trained by the regiment.

 The regiment raised the following mountain artillery grouping: 7°.
 The regiment raised the following mountain artillery groups: XVII (72nd, 73rd, 74th bty.), XVIII (75th, 76th, 77th bty.), XXIV (56th, 60th, 62nd bty.), XXVII (88th, 89th, 90th bty.), XXXI (97th, 98th, 99th bty.), XXXII, XL, XLV, XLVI, XLVII, XLVIII, LV, LVI, LVII, LIX, LX, and LXVI.

Note 3: The Genova group's 60th Mountain Artillery Battery and the Como group's 62nd Mountain Artillery Battery were not raised until November 1916 for lack of available 65/17 mod. 13 cannons.

Interwar Years - New Numbering 
Traditionally Alpini units had been numbered from West to East with the 1st Alpini Regiment being the most westward and the 8th Alpini Regiment being the most eastward. However as the 3rd Mountain Artillery Regiment had been raised last it found itself now in the middle between the 1st Mountain Artillery Regiment in the West and the 2nd Mountain Artillery Regiment in the East. To rectify this on 11 March 1926 the 2nd and 3rd mountain artillery regiments swapped numbers.

Current Structure
The regiment was part of the Army's Artillery Command and was equipped with FH-70 towed howitzers.

 Regimental Command
  Command and Logistic Support Battery
  21st Target Acquisition and Surveillance Battery
  Artillery Group Vicenza
  19th Howitzer Battery
  20th Howitzer Battery
  41st Technical Support Battery

References

External links 
 Official website

Alpini
Regiments of Italy in World War I
Regiments of Italy in World War II
Artillery regiments of Italy